General elections were held in the Bechuanaland Protectorate in 1961.

Background
A new constitution had been enacted in December 1960, which created both a Legislative Council and an advisory African Council. The Legislative Council had just over 30 members; 10 colonial officials, 10 blacks, 10 whites, one Asian and some co-opted members. The 10 black members were elected by the African Council, whilst the 10 whites and the Asian member were all directly elected.

The African Council consisted of the eight heads of the Tswana chiefdoms and some elected members.

Results
Seretse Khama received the most votes in the election for the black representatives. The Council was inaugurated in June.

References

Elections in Botswana
Bechuanaland
1961 in Bechuanaland Protectorate
Election and referendum articles with incomplete results
1961 elections in the British Empire